Viru Sputnik is an Estonian ice hockey team playing in the Meistriliiga but hasn't participated in it since the 2016-17 season. The club is based in Kohtla-Järve and the home arena is Kohtla-Järve Ice Hall. Viru Sputnik has played in Meistriliiga since it was established in 2003.

In 2009–10 season they became the Estonian champions, 2008–09 and 2010–11 season they placed second.

Roster
20  Jevgeni Jakubovits 07.02.1988
?  Aleksandr Sudas 13.02.1989
5  Denis Golubev 01.09.1989
7  Deniss Volodin 03.04.1988
10  Aleksei Petrovits 18.06.1986
12  Boleslav Kruglik 18.04.1988
16  Siim Naarits 07.06.1992
21  Ilja Ponomarjov 08.11.1991
8  Vadim Bazura 26.01.1988
?  German Kurganov 03.03.1990
?  Maksim Urlihh 19.01.1991
22  Sergei Mihhailov 17.01.1990
?  Ruslan Mamedov 19.02.1991
14  Konstantin Gristsenko 08.06.1991
24  Maksim Borovikov 13.02.1992
?  Sergei Silenko 12.03.1992
?  Toivo Tilku 04.04.1989
?  Dmitri Soitu 28.12.1989
?  Aleksandr Smetanin  25.05.1980

References

External links
 

Ice hockey teams in Estonia
Sport in Kohtla-Järve